The 1928 United States presidential election in Connecticut took place on November 6, 1928, as part of the 1928 United States presidential election which was held throughout all contemporary 48 states. Voters chose seven representatives, or electors to the Electoral College, who voted for president and vice president. 

Connecticut voted for the Republican nominee, Secretary of Commerce Herbert Hoover of California, over the Democratic nominee, Governor Alfred E. Smith of New York. Hoover's running mate was Senate Majority Leader Charles Curtis of Kansas, while Smith ran with Senator Joseph Taylor Robinson of Arkansas.

Hoover won Connecticut by 8.06%.

Results

By county

See also
 United States presidential elections in Connecticut

References

Connecticut
1928
1928 Connecticut elections